Oliver Wyss (born August 29, 1974) is the President of Soccer Operations and General Manager for the Orange County SC.

Biography
Wyss was born in Solothurn, Switzerland. His father was a professional soccer player.

References

1974 births
Living people
Swiss men's footballers
Swiss expatriate football managers
Swiss expatriate footballers
Orange County SC coaches
Association footballers not categorized by position
People from Solothurn
Expatriate soccer managers in the United States
Expatriate soccer players in the United States
USL Championship coaches
FC Solothurn players
Los Angeles Salsa players
Anaheim Splash players
Continental Indoor Soccer League players
USL Second Division players
Switzerland youth international footballers
Sportspeople from the canton of Solothurn